Sheepshead is an American trick-taking card game derived from Bavaria's national card game, Schafkopf. Sheepshead is most commonly played by five players, but variants exist to allow for two to eight players. There are also many other variants to the game rules, and many slang terms used with the game.

Sheepshead is most commonly played in Wisconsin, where it is sometimes called the "unofficial" state card game. In 1983, it was declared the official card game of the city of Milwaukee. It is also common among German counties in Southern Indiana, which has large German-American populations, and on the Internet. 

Numerous tournaments are held throughout Wisconsin during the year, with the largest tournament being the "Nationals", held annually in the Wisconsin Dells during a weekend in September, October or November, and mini-tournaments held hourly throughout German Fest in Milwaukee during the last weekend of each July. National 3-Hand Sheepshead Tournament has been held annually in Wisconsin since 1970 in the month of March. 48-hand sessions are held at locations around the state, offering players an opportunity to play in as many of the 100 plus sessions as they wish.

Etymology
Schafkopf literally means "sheep's head" and may refer to the practice going back over a century of recording the score by drawing a stylised head of a sheep with nine lines. However, some sources argue that the term was probably derived and translated incorrectly from Middle High German and referred to playing cards on a barrel head (from kopf, meaning head, and Schaff, meaning a barrel).

Rules

Preparation
Sheepshead is played with 7-8-9-10-J-Q-K-A in four suits, for a total of 32 cards. This is also known as a Piquet deck, as opposed to the 52 or 54 present in a full French deck (also known as a Poker deck, or a regular deck of playing cards). A sheepshead deck is made by removing all of the jokers, sixes, fives, fours, threes, and twos from a standard deck.

Card strength
Card strength in sheepshead is different from in most other games. It is one of the most difficult things for some beginners to grasp.

There are 14 cards in the trump suit: all four queens, all four jacks, and all of 
the diamonds. In order of strength from greatest to least:
 Q♣ Q♠ Q♥ Q♦ 
 J♣ J♠ J♥ J♦  
 A♦ 10♦ K♦ 9♦ 8♦ 7♦ 
Also, there are 3 "fail" suits, each containing 6 cards (18 total).
 A, 10, K, 9, 8, and 7 of ♣, ♠, and ♥
Clubs, spades, and hearts take no precedence over other fail suits, unlike trump, which always take fail. (Notice how both aces and tens outrank kings; arguably the most confusing aspect of card strength). The lead suit must be followed if possible; if not, then any card may be played such as trump (which will take the trick), or a fail card. Playing a fail of a different suit is called "throwing off" and can be a way to clear up another suit. Additionally, throwing off a point card is called "schmearing."

Card point values
Each card is given a separate point value as follows:

 Ace — 11 points
 Ten — 10 points
 King — 4 points
 Queen — 3 points
 Jack — 2 points
 9, 8, 7 — 0 points

The strongest cards (queens and jacks) are not worth the most points, giving Sheepshead some of its unusual character.

There are 120 points total in the deck. The goal of the game is to get half of these (60 or 61); in case of a tie, the player who picked up the blinds loses, and that player's opponents win. (There are variant rules for more peculiar situations, such as the Leaster.)

Scoring
Score is kept using game points (not to be confused with the point values of the cards) or using money. Points are given/taken on a zero-sum basis.

The following chart shows the game points for a five-person game (though other variations, with a different number of players, have different scoring). Game points are awarded based on the point value of cards taken during the hand. When playing for money, each game point generally represents a common money unit.

  Thirty or thirty-one game points are called schneider -- that is, the picker (and partner, if any) are required to get 31 game points to get schneider, and the opponents are required to get only 30.
  There are 120 card points in the deck. Since it is possible to take a trick worth zero points, 120 points could be gotten without getting all of the tricks and thus the distinction between "All Tricks" and "120 points" is necessary.
  Players gain or lose game points such that a net gain of zero occurs.

The deal
The deck is shuffled and cut. The dealer then deals cards, starting with the player to the dealer's left, and typically two or three at a time to each person. In most standard five and six-handed games, two cards are also dealt to a separate pile called the "blind." Usually this is dealt as a pair between rounds of dealing at any time so long as the last two cards are not dealt into the blind (because the dealer might inadvertently reveal the bottom card while dealing or shuffling).

When done with a five-handed deal, each player should have six cards, with two in the blind.

In one variant, a player may require a redeal if the player's hand has no aces, no face cards, no trump, and no count/point cards. ("No ace, no face, no trump, no count.")

Picking
The player to the left of the dealer gets first choice to take the blind (the two face-down cards not dealt to any player). If he passes, the option is given to the next player (in clockwise order). There are several Variations for if the dealer does not wish to pick up the blind—the dealer may be required to pick up the blind, or may have the option to call a Leaster, or may be able to call a Doubler.

The individual who takes the blind is called the "picker". The picker adds the two cards in the blind to his hand and then must choose two cards to lay down or "bury". The buried cards are added to the picker's score if the picker's side takes at least one trick.

The picker may also have a partner on his team who will then play against the remaining players. Depending on the variant or house-rule, the partner must automatically be the player with the jack of diamonds, or the picker may be able to call the ace of a fail suit and have that player be his partner. These are discussed in the Variations section.

One of the more intriguing aspects of Sheepshead is that the picker and partner change each hand, and a good deal of the game's strategy is in determining which player is the partner, as his identity is usually not revealed until after the game has begun.

Game play
After the picker has buried their cards, the person to the left of the dealer plays the first card. Play continues clockwise until everyone has played. Every player must follow suit if possible. Trump is considered a suit, so if trump is led, and a player has trump in their hand, they must play trump. If a player cannot follow suit, then they can play any card from their hand. The person who played the card with the highest strength takes the "trick" (the highest trump, or if none, the highest card of the fail suit that was led). The player who took the previous trick then plays, or "leads," a new card for the second trick. After all tricks have been taken, their point values are totaled and the winner declared, with all players adding or reducing their personal points accordingly (see the charts, above). The deal then shifts to the person to the left of the previous dealer.

Strategy

Picker and partner
  The picker and partner should almost always lead trump. The picker should have the strongest hand, as he received additional cards, received free points in his bury, and hopefully had a stronger hand before picking. So for each trump he/she loses, four trump are lost by the other players. This is especially important in the called aces variant, as this gives the ace a much better chance of walking, or going around the table without being trumped.
  When the picker is weak, sometimes it may be wise to lead fail and hope that the partner can take the trick. In these circumstances, the partner leading trump may drain the picker's trump faster than a strong opponent, though this strategy may be dangerous if the partner is still unknown.
  Generally speaking, it is better to clear out as many suits of fail as possible when burying; it is better to have two clubs than to have a heart and a club. There are exceptions to this rule.
  Generally, it is best not to pick up the blind unless the player has four or more trump in a five-handed game, and it is best if at least one of those trump is a queen. Picking on three trump is unwise, unless they are very highly powered cards or the picker has point cards to place into the blind

Opponents
  In the called aces variant, the opponents should usually lead another card of the called suit, as it is required by rule that the picker and partner must have and play a card of that fail suit for sure. Since there are five players and (usually) six cards in each fail suit, it is likely that one of the opponents will not have a card of that suit and thus be able to trump the trick and take the called ace for at least 11 points. If the opponents wait, an opponent might be able to throw off his single card in the called suit and thereafter be able to trump the first trick of the called suit. However, waiting is dangerous because there are only six tricks in the five-player game, and the picker usually tries to lead trump and thus bleed the opponents of their trump—in part for the very purpose of avoiding this tactic by the opponents.
  If the picker has one card of a given suit, they are more likely to have another card of that same suit than to have one of another fail suit. Leading that suit back at them (if possible) is a common strategy that will allow for a greater chance for the opponents to be able to trump or schmear the trick.
  Watch for tell-tale play. If a player schmears an ace or ten in front of the picker, there's a good chance that they are the partner.
  Never lead trump unless absolutely necessary; doing so will likely hurt the opponent's team more than the picker/partner.

All players
  Point counting is a very valuable skill when playing Sheepshead, as it enables a player to know if a trick must be taken or if they've already won, enabling them to change their strategy to try for a greater victory.
Trump counting is also important to keep track of the number of trump that have already been played, especially the queens and to a lesser extent the jacks.
 The order of play is a very important consideration while playing. There is a distinct benefit to "being on the end,". At times it may be worth bumping (taking a trick away from a teammate) in order to keep the opposition team members from being the last to play in the following trick.
  In three or four-handed games, aces are much more likely to walk than in games with more players.

Sheep Head variant
Sheep Head is when there are four players and 24 cards are used instead of 32. Cards are shuffled by the dealer and cut (split it in two) by the player to the dealer's right. Two cards are dealt at a time. The most powerful trumps are as follows, Q of clubs, Q of spades, J of clubs, J of spades, J of hearts, J of diamonds, A of diamonds (fox), 10 of diamonds, K of diamonds, Q of diamonds, 9 of diamonds. The non-trump strengths are A, 10, K, Q, 9. The queen of hearts is no longer trump (it is actually a very weak card). Players have partners. The main objective is to get the ace of diamonds, also known as "the fox". The "fox catchers" are the top 6 most powerful trump. There is no picker, nor blind cards. When a card leads a trick, other players must follow suit, or trump if the trick is led with trump. The point system is based on the fox, 1 point, and however many "counters" a player has. The "counter cards" are always ace, 10, and king. If a player wins the last trick, they get 1 extra counter, with 13 counters in total. 7 to 9 counters is one point, and 10 to 12 counters is two points. The game is usually played to 21 or 42 points and whichever team reaches the number wins. If a player gets all the "fox catchers" in their hand, it is known as "automatic bucking", where the team automatically wins 14 points. If a player wins all the tricks, it is known as a "buck", where the team wins 7 points, it is like winning all 13 counters, but getting a higher reward from it.

Play variations
There are a number of different play variations for Sheepshead. Variants may change how partners are chosen, scoring, the suits considered fail, or what occurs when the blind is not picked. Variations in the number of players are discussed in the next section.

Partners
The following two variants apply only to five and six-player games, and possibly four-player games. Variants differ in whether the picker is permitted to choose to play alone, and in whether there are some situations where the picker may be required to play alone.

Called Ace
The picker chooses a called ace suit after picking the blind. Whoever has this called ace will be his partner. There are a few further rules behind this.

  The called suit must be a fail suit (clubs, spades or hearts).
  The picker must have at least one of the fail suit in his/her hand. The picker must keep at least one card of the fail suit in his hand (i.e. cannot throw them all off) until the first trick for which that suit is led, and then of course must follow suit. Also on the first trick for which that suit is led, the partner must play the ace (even if the player has another card of that suit).
  If the picker has all 3 fail aces, he may call a 10 instead of an ace. The picker is obligated to hold the ace of that suit in his hand. When the called suit is led, the picker must play the ace. In addition, the person with the 10 takes the trick if it is not trumped.
  If the picker does not have all 3 fail aces but has no fail suits for which he or she does not also have the ace, the picker may still call another fail suit's ace and utilize an "unknown." The picker lays a card face down (typically a low fail card or their lowest trump) and calls a fail suit for the unknown to represent. The unknown is played face down and has no power to take tricks, though its point value remains at the end of the game. Only the player taking the unknown is allowed to look at it until the end of the game
  In some variants, the picker can call a suit for which he has the ace; he must save the ace and then he is his own "secret" partner.
  The picker can choose to go alone after picking up the blind. In this case, there will be no called ace.

Jack of diamonds
In this variant, the partner is automatically the individual with the jack of diamonds. Unlike the Called Ace variant, the partner is not required to play the jack of diamonds with any required haste; thus the identity of the partner is usually secret for more of the game.

The normal rule is that if the picker has the jack of diamonds, whether as a result of the deal or picking up the jack in the blind, the picker must play alone. However, there are a number of variants within this method of play.

  Sometimes, the picker is allowed to "call up" to the jack of hearts if he has the jack of diamonds in his hand. Sometimes he's also allowed to call the jack of spades or clubs if he has the two or three lower jacks in his hand. Some variants require that the picker call up before seeing the blind, and thus in this variant the picker is stuck without a partner if the jack of diamonds is in the blinds.
  In some variants, the picker calls the jack of clubs instead of the jack of diamonds—but typically the variant does not permit the picker to call down to the jack of spades.
  In some variants, if the picker has the jack of diamonds and wishes to play alone (cut-throat), the jack of diamonds must be kept in play and not buried.
  In a relatively new variant, the picker may call a non-trump ace if he has the jack of diamonds. As in the ace variations above, the picker must keep at least one card in the called suit. A difference from the typical ace variations is that the partner is usually not required to play the ace when that suit is played if they have additional cards in that suit. This is to maintain the intrigue associated with the "who's the partner" aspect of the game. If the picker does not have an ace they can call (an example would be five trump and an ace, king, seven of the same suit) they are considered "stuck" and must go alone.

Scoring

Calling sheepshead
One variant allows the picker to call "sheepshead." This means that the picker believes he can take every trick. If he succeeds he receives twice the number of points for a trickless game, but if he misses a single trick (even one lacking points), he must pay twice the value his opponents would have paid him for a trickless hand.

  The picker is almost always required to play alone if he calls sheepshead. Because of this, it is generally applied only to the jacks variant, or cut-throat games.
  Sometimes the picker is not allowed to call sheepshead if he does not have the jack in five or six-handed games.

Double on the bump
If the picker/partner do not win, they are "bumped". The standard method of playing Sheepshead is that the picker/partner lose two times the points that opponents would lose in a similar loss. This may be called the "Punish the picker" rule. Some house rules do not enforce this "Punish" rule.
Some house rules require the picker to take at least one trick. If the picker/partner do not take at least one trick and lose, then only the picker loses points. Picker -18, partner 0, opponents +6.

Cracking
In this variant, when a player picks up the blind, any player who was not given the opportunity to pick up the blind and who is not the picker's partner may knock or crack by knocking the table with their fist. This automatically doubles the point values determining the score when the game ends. In the aces variant, the crack must take place after the ace has been called but before the first card is played.

  Some variants allow the picker or the picker's partner to re-crack, or crack-back resulting in a quadrupling of the end scores.
  Some variants allow any player (who is not the picker or the picker's partner and did not crack) to castrate resulting in an octupling of the end scores.
  In another variation, after a crack the partner may crack-around-the-corner, serving the same effect as a re-crack, but revealing himself as the partner at the same time. Generally in any game where cracking is allowed, each player may only crack once, regardless of team.

Blitzing or blitzers
This variant allows players to double the point value of the game by revealing that they have the two black or red queens.

  Typically, a blitz may only occur after a crack or re-crack.
  Some variants allow for a blitzing with the two black jacks, the two middle jacks or all four jacks.
  Some variants allow for blitzers after the hand has been played. Players with both black queens need to declare blitzers after playing the second queen during the hand.
  Because of the possibility of escalation, a limit may be placed to cap the maximum value the points are multiplied from blitzing and cracking.

Trump

Diamonds vs. clubs

Typically, diamonds are considered trump, but some groups use another suit (typically clubs around North Central Wisconsin). This would mean a nine of diamonds would be fail while a nine of clubs is trump instead.

Alternatively, in some groups, the strengths of the various queens and jacks differ from standard rules.

Spitz
A variant popular in some areas of Minnesota and Wisconsin is to change the order of strength of the trump cards. This is done by increasing the seven of diamond's strength to second in the list of trump:
 Q♣ 7♦ Q♠ Q♥ Q♦ J♣ J♠ J♥ J♦ A♦ 10♦ K♦ 9♦ 8♦ 
When playing this variant the seven of diamonds is referred to as "the Spitz". Another variation puts the seven of diamonds first in the list of trump.

No picker
Several different scenarios can occur if no one picks up the blind, including a forced pick, a Leaster, a Mittler, or a Doubler.

Forced pick
In this variant, the person on the end is required to pick the blind. This is sometimes offset by a "No Punish" rule, and statistics; if no one desired the blind, then there's a better chance that the blind has decent cards, unless the trump is evenly spread out.

Leasters
In a leaster, the person with the fewest points wins the hand. There is no partner, and the winner simply receives one point from every opponent in the game. The blind is set aside and normally given to the player who takes the last trick. House rules may allow the dealer to declare which trick is given the blind (e.g. the first trick, or the second, etc.). Another house rule may be to set the blind aside so it is not given to anyone. The blind is not viewed until after the hand is over.
 A common variant is to require a trick to win. In this variant, therefore, a player who takes every trick wins. As two further variants to this variant: (A) if a player takes a trick that has no points (all 7s 8s and 9s), and/or (B) a player wins by taking every trick—then, the winners gets points as if winning a "no trick" after picking up the blinds. 
 One variant used when playing with three players is: a player may win without taking a trick, and actually wins double in this situation.
 In the event of a tied score, no stakes are exchanged, and the game proceeds to the next hand.

Mosters
A variant of the leaster is the moster, which is played the same as a leaster, but after the hand is scored, the player who took the most points pays out (as if for a simple loss) to all the rest of the players.  Thus, in a five-player game, the affected player loses four points and the opponents get one each, unless the score is doubled by other means (cracking, etc.).  The exception is taking all of the tricks, which is still scored as a win by the player doing so.

Mittlers (Middlers)
An alternative to playing Leasters or Mosters, the player who wins this “no picker” game has the median number (middle value) of points among the five players after the hand is scored.  Thus, the winner of the Mittler will have the third highest number of points.  There will be two players with higher points and two players with lower points.  If there is no clear middle value, no stakes are exchanged.  This game is also known as “Michigan Mediocre,” named by the Ann Arbor Sheepshead Society (AASS) that created this variant.

Doublers
In a doubler, the cards are reshuffled and a new hand is dealt and played as normal. However, at the end of this redeal, the point values lost and gained are doubled.

The pot
Typically occurring with a leaster (and during cash games), one point is placed into a pot for the next hand. Then, if the picker wins the hand, he splits the pot with the partner (in a five handed game, the extra point goes to the picker such that he receives three and the partner receives a single point). However, if the picker loses the hand, the picker and partner must pay into the pot what they would have received.
 
  In some games, the picker and partner double the pot when losing; in others, they simply add a single pot each time. Additionally, the picker and partner may take the entire pot on a win, or they may receive a single pot.
  If the game ends before the pot is taken, or continues to build over several turns, the pot may be divided out to the individuals evenly. Alternately, showdowns may be played, where five cards are dealt one at a time to every player face side up. The best five-card poker hand then takes one or all of the pots.
  If a new player joins a game with a pot (bringing a game from five to six-handed, etc.,) typically the pot is divided up, or the new player adds one point for every pot present.

Schwanzers (Show Down)
All players reveal their cards after everyone has passed a dealt hand to discover the loser who pays the table 1 point each.  The blind is discarded.

In German, Schwanzer means truant or hooky player.  Truant relates to a student being absent from school.  When absent from school education is missed.  Missing education results in being uneducated.   Therefore, a Schwanzer occurs because at least one player is uneducated in how to pick in the game of Sheepshead. 

The purpose of a Schwanzer, also known as a showdown, is to catch maurers without playing a leaster or another variant of a “no pick” situation. The loser is determined by the highest number of points in a hand.  The Schwanzer points are scaled as follows: Queens = 3 points, Jacks = 2 points, Diamonds = 1 point

For example, a hand with the Queen of spades (3 points), Jack of clubs (2 points), Ace of diamonds (1 point), 8 of diamonds (1 point), 10 of clubs (0 points), and 7 of spades (0 points) equals the Schwanzer point value of 7. (3+2+1+1)

If tied in points, the player with the most powerful trump loses.  For example, a hand with the Queen of clubs (3 points) and Queen of diamonds (3 points) loses to the hand with Queen of spades (3 points), Jack of clubs (2 points) and the Ace of diamonds (1 point).

Variations in the number of players
There are numerous variations in rules, so a discussion of house rules generally occurs before play begins. The following variations can be employed to accommodate different numbers of players.

Two-handed
1) Each player is dealt four cards in a row, face down. Then, four cards are dealt face up to each player and placed on top of the first four cards.  The eight cards in front of each player are referred to as their 'battery' in the text below. Then, eight cards are dealt to each player's hand. 

Every hand is played with no picking nor partner.  Whichever player gets the higher number of points wins the hand.

Each trick has four cards - one from each player's hand, and one from each player's battery (table cards).  The highest card, per normal rules, takes the trick.  At the end of the trick, any uncovered face down card is turned face up, and is in play for the next trick.

For the first trick, the non-dealer leads a card from their hand, then the dealer plays from their hand, then the non-dealer's battery, then the dealer's battery.  Whichever hand or battery takes the trick must lead the next trick.  Each trick is 'hand hand battery battery', or 'battery battery hand hand'.

2) Sixteen cards are dealt face down in a four by four rectangle. Players are not allowed to look at the face-down cards. Then, a card is dealt face-up on top of these. The sixteen cards (eight stacks of two cards) closest to the dealer are the dealer's cards. A card must be face-up to be played. The opponent starts the first trick by playing one of his face-up cards, and the dealer responds by playing one of his. After each trick is played, any face-down cards uncovered are turned face-up. Play continues until all 32 cards have been played. Players are not allowed to look at their own face-down cards.

Three-handed
1) Each player is dealt ten cards, with two going to the blind. The picker faces the other two players.

2) The sevens of clubs and spades are removed, leaving thirty cards. Nine cards are then dealt to each player, with three going to the blind. The picker faces the others.

3) The six non-trump sevens and eights are removed, dealing eight cards to each player, with two in the blind.

Four-handed
1) Seven cards are dealt to each player with four in the blind. Given the large blind, this variation required the picker go cut-throat (without a partner).

2) The seven of clubs and seven of spades are removed (or the six of clubs and six of spades are added). Seven (or eight) cards are dealt to each player, with two in the blind. Either the jack or ace partner rules may be used.

3) Each player is dealt eight cards, with no blind. Either (A) the two players holding the black queens are partners, where the partners are secret until both cards are played, a player holding both black queens plays cut-throat against the three others; (B) the partners are the first two queens played; or (C) the partners are the first two played of any card agreed upon before the deal (7s, 8s, 9s, Ks, 10s, Js, Qs). In all these variations, the players with the agreed upon partner cards (black, red, or first two played) are considered the picker and partner for scoring purposes. In the latter variations, the timing of playing the agreed upon card is particularly important. For example, it may be worth it to waste the queen or play a card out of normal strategy to become partners with an individual who has already taken a good trick or two, or to avoid being stuck cut-throat or with a bad partner.

4) In this variation popular in southern Indiana, jacks are higher than queens (still clubs-spades-hearts-diamonds), and hearts (rather than diamonds) are trump. All four players are dealt eight cards. Starting with the player to the left of the dealer, the player has the option to "call" (call an fail-suit ace for a partner), go solo (cut-throat), or pass. When going solo, the player may play a "best" (pay normally against the other three), a "side solo" (call another suit rather than hearts to be trump, and then play against the other three), or a "Billy" (plays against the three others but attempts not to take a trick).

Scoring: Players play to 24 on the given system:

 Players who win a call (caller and partner, or both opponents) gain 2, 4, or 6 points (normal victory, no-schneider, and no-trick).
 The caller winning a side solo gains 18 points, and opponents would gain 6 points if they win—and both are regardless of whether the opponents take a trick or get schneider.
 Winning a best wins the game outright.

Five-handed
Six cards are dealt to each player, with two to the blind. A partner may be chosen by either the ace or jack rules. The partner is the player with the called ace.

Six-handed
1) Five cards are dealt to each player, with two cards in the blind. The partner is automatically the jack of diamonds, and the game is played two against four. If the picker gets the jack of diamonds in the blind, he/she may call the next higher jack, not in his/her hand.

2) Five cards are dealt to each player, with two cards in the blind. The partner is automatically the jack of diamonds and the ace of the called suit, with the game played three against three. If the picker gets the jack of diamonds in the blind or the jack of diamonds has the ace of the called suit, it is played two against four.

3) Discard the sevens of clubs and spades.  Five cards are dealt to each player, with no blind.  Queen of clubs and queen of spades are partners, it is played two against four.

4) Discard the sevens of clubs and spades.  Five cards are dealt to each player, with no blind. Seven of Diamonds is the highest trump.  Queen of clubs, queen of spades, and jack of diamonds are partners. A player having both black queens or a black queen and jack of diamonds has the option to pass one of the cards to the player to the left for one of their cards. Passing must be done before the lead player plays out. Double on the bump is applied to this variation.

Seven-handed
1) Four cards are dealt to each player, with four to the blind. The picker takes all four cards from the blind, and buries four. The partner is automatically the jack of diamonds. If the picker has the jack, he/she may call up to the next highest jack, not in his/her hand.

2) Four cards are dealt to each player, with four to the blind. The picker takes two cards from the blind, and the player immediately behind him takes the other two blind cards; they bury together and then play as partners against the other five. Also known as Shit-On-Your-Neighbor sheepshead.

3) Four cards are dealt to each player, with four to the blind. The picker takes three cards from the blind, and the player immediately behind him take the other card. The partner is automatically the jack of diamonds. The player behind the picker is not automatically the partner, so his bury may count towards the picker's opponents.

4) Four cards are dealt to each player, with four to the blind. A die is rolled, and the partner is whatever number is on the die with 1 representing the player to the pickers left, and counting clockwise with six being the person to the picker's right. Each takes and buries two cards.

5) Four cards are dealt to each player, with four to the blind. The picker takes 0, 1, or 2 cards, the person behind him/her is partner and takes 2, 1, or 0 card respectively. The two remaining cards are not revealed and are automatically buried for the other team. The Dealer may go "nuclear" giving all 4 of his cards to the other team's bury and taking the entire blind, the person behind him/her is still a partner.

6) Four cards are dealt to each player, with four to the blind. The picker takes 2 or all 4 cards in the blinds. If the picker takes 2 he rolls a die to determine his partner, who will take the other 2. The number rolled correlates to the partner by counting players clockwise of the picker. If the picker takes all 4 cards from the blinds, they play alone. For the picker to take all four cards in the blind, they must do so by taking them all at once. Players are not allowed to look at 2 and then decide if they want the remaining 2 cards in the blinds.

Eight-handed
1) Four cards are dealt to each player. The two black queens are partners.

2) Four cards are dealt to each player. The queen of clubs, jack of diamonds, and 7 of diamonds are partners. If one partner has two of these cards, they can call the 8 of diamonds (if they have the 7 and the queen or jack) or jack of hearts (if they have the queen and the jack). If the other partner already has the 8 of diamonds or jack of hearts they can call again. It should always be 3 on 5 unless the partner chooses not to call another partner.

3) Four cards dealt to each player. First two queens played are partners.

Glossary / Slang
The following phrases or slang can be used to describe certain behaviors or situations in the game.

Mauer
A player "mauers" when the player has enough power-cards to pick up the blind, and yet passes (whether for fear one's hand is not actually good enough, or worse, one hopes to set up another player to lose). Mauering is considered to be in very poor taste and in some cases players who do it often enough can be asked to leave a game. Of course, mauering can backfire if the hand results in a leaster, and the mauerer is stuck with what is then a poor hand.

There are different methods of deciding if a player has a strong hand. In a five-handed game, some players pick on any four trumps, while others decide based on the number of higher trump (queens and jacks). Others use a numbering system, giving each type of trump a point value and making the decision to pick based on a certain number of points. Statistically, players who have an opportunity to pick first need a stronger hand, while picking on the end usually means that since nobody else picked, the trump is fairly evenly spread out. Because of the complex nature of the game, in most cases, mauering is a matter of opinion.

Schmear
A player "schmears" a trick by playing a high-point card (usually an ace or ten) into a trick that a player thinks will be (or has already been) taken by one of their partners, in order to increase the points earned on that trick. The term may also be a noun, referring to the high-point card played in this manner. An example of schmearing (by Opponents 2 and 3):

 Partner leads 10♦ (10 points)
 Opponent 1 plays Q♣ (3 points)
 Opponent 2 plays A♦ (11 points)
 Picker plays 8♦ (0 points)
 Opponent 3 (out of trump) plays 10♠ (10 points)

This trick was worth 34 points. That's schneider all by itself.

Opponent 1 is guaranteed to win the trick as the queen of clubs is the highest card. As a result, opponents 2 and 3 both took advantage of the situation and put high-counting cards down. Also note that the picker played the 8♦, a no-counting card—the opposite of schmearing.

Schmearing is an important strategy. In this example, schmearing increased the value of the trick by 21 points to a total of 34 points—schneider all by itself and over a quarter of the points available.

Renege (Cheating)
A player "reneges" means to fail to follow suit when able and required by the rules to do so. Reneging is a form of cheating. In most circles, this results in the guilty party forfeiting the hand.

Granny hand
When a player holds all or most of the top trump there is no way for the opposition to win. This unusually powerful hand is often derided for its ease of play; "My granny could win that hand." The hand still counts and is played out.

In some circles, the player simply lays down the granny hand and the opponents conceding by acclamation. Even if not completely a granny hand, some circles permit a player to state that he believes he will take all of the remaining tricks (possibly requiring an explanation, say, "I have all of the remaining trump"), giving opponents an opportunity to object (say, if the calling player miscounted trump) -- forestalling the players from needing to play out the remainder of the hand.

Bumping
When a teammate uses a higher powered card to take a trick that already is already going to his/her team—usually when the trick is necessarily going to another teammate. Sometimes this is unavoidable especially in cases where there is only one card of a particular suit left in a player's hand. Sometimes this is strategic, such as to place an opponent on each side of the picker and/or the partner.

Collusion (Cheating)
As with any partner game, code words or signs can be used to cheat. This involves 2 players creating a word or phrase which tells their partner in crime what to lead. For instance, Player A and Player B are colluding with each other in a game of 4 handed. Player A has the lead and Player B is behind the dealer without a fail Spade. Player B uses the phrase "let's rock n' roll" to signal Player A to lead spades. Player A leads spades, the picker trumps it, and Player B trumps over the Picker. This is very much frowned upon and if caught, the players are usually kicked out of the game. Also called “Table Talk”.

Throwing Off / Slough
A player "throws off" or "sloughs" when, after a fail card is played and the player does not have any of that fail suit but does have trump, decides to play a fail card rather than trump. Sloughing well is a key to winning at Sheepshead, especially as the picker. One popular situation to throw off is as follows and is known as "The Throw Off"; (1) a fail suit is led that the picker does not have, (2) the picker is 2nd in line, and (3) the picker throws off, usually because he has a poor hand, hoping his partner can take the trick.

See also
Doppelkopf
Ombre
Schafkopf - ancestor of Sheepshead
Skat
Boon

References

Further reading
 Rosch. Erica M. A Field Guide to Sheepshead. Oregon, WI: Badger Books, 2001.
 Strupp, Robert, M. How to Play "Winning" 5-handed Sheepshead. Milwaukee, WI: Author, 1993.
 Wergin, Joseph P. Wergin on Skat and Sheepshead. McFarland, WI: Author, 1975.

External links
Sheepshead.org
Sheepshead Home Page
Sheepshead rules and information
Sheepshead Scoring Apps
Play Sheepshead online

American card games
Schafkopf group
Year of introduction missing
French deck card games